Cecelia Peters, known professionally as Cece Peters, is an Australian television and theatre actress. Her career began with playing Tiger Johnson on the Nine Network children's series Snake Tales. She later joined the cast of the Network Ten drama series Playing for Keeps,  playing Paige Dunkeley.

Career
Peters secured a role on the Nine Network series Snake Tales, playing Tiger Johnson. The show follows a group of children whose parents run a snake sanctuary. She was then known professionally as Cecelia Peters. She then appeared in an episode of City Homicide as Jade Worthington. In 2013, Peters graduated from the Western Australian Academy of Performing Arts. Her affiliation with the WAAPA gave Peters the opportunity to be involved in various professional theatre productions, including Hamlet.

In 2015, Peters had a role in the mini-series Catching Milat. In 2016, the actress secured the role of junior television producer Alice Felton-Smith in the Network Ten drama The Wrong Girl.

In 2018, she appeared as Julie in the Nine Network's True Story with Hamish & Andy. In May that year it was announced that Peters had secured the regular role of Paige Dunkeley in the Network Ten drama series Playing for Keeps. The show is about a group of AFL players and their wives' personal lives. She assumes the role of a "down-to-earth high school teacher".

Filmography

References

External links
 

Living people
21st-century Australian actresses
Australian television actresses
Year of birth missing (living people)